Grozeşti may refer to:

 Grozești, Iași, a commune in Iaşi County, Romania
 Grozești, Mehedinți, a commune in Mehedinţi County, Romania
 Grozeşti, the former name of Oituz Commune, Bacău County, Romania
 Grozeşti, Nisporeni, a commune in Nisporeni district, Moldova

See also 
 Groza (surname)
 Grozăvești (disambiguation)